In graph theory, the graph removal lemma states that when a graph contains few copies of a given subgraph, then all of the copies can be eliminated by removing a small number of edges.
The special case in which the subgraph is a triangle is known as the triangle removal lemma.

The graph removal lemma can be used to prove Roth's theorem on 3-term arithmetic progressions, and a generalization of it, the hypergraph removal lemma, can be used to prove Szemerédi's theorem. It also has applications to property testing.

Formulation
Let  be a graph with  vertices. The graph removal lemma states that for any

Here, the  indicates the use of little o notation.

In the case when  is a triangle, resulting lemma is called triangle removal lemma.

History

The original motivation for the study of triangle removal lemma was Ruzsa–Szemerédi problem. Initial formulation due to Imre Z. Ruzsa and Szemerédi from 1978 was slightly weaker than the triangle removal lemma used nowadays and can be roughly stated as follows: every locally linear graph on  vertices contains  edges. This statement can be quickly deduced from a modern triangle removal lemma. Ruzsa and Szemerédi provided also an alternative proof of Roth's theorem on arithmetic progressions as a simple corollary. 

The modern formulation of graph removal lemma was first stated by Füredi in 1994. The proof generalized earlier approaches by Ruzsa and Szemerédi and Erdős, Frankl, and Rödl, also utilizing Szemerédi regularity lemma.

Graph counting lemma
A key component of the proof of graph removal lemma is the graph counting lemma about counting subgraphs in systems of regular pairs. Graph counting lemma is also very useful on its own. According to Füredi, it is used "in most applications of regularity lemma".

Heuristic argument
Let  be sets of vertices of some graph  such that for all  pair  is -regular (in the sense of regularity lemma). Intuitively, regular pair  with density  should behave like a random Erdős–Rényi-like graph, where every pair of vertices  is selected to be an edge independently with probability .

Precise statement
The straightforward formalization of above heuristic claim is as follows. Let  be arbitrary.

Blow-up Lemma
The following claim appears in the literature under name of the blow-up lemma and was first proven by Komlós, Sárközy and Szemerédi. Precise statement here is a slightly simplified version due to Komlós, who referred to it also as the key lemma, as it is used in numerous regularity-based proofs.

Define . Finally, let  be a graph and  be disjoint sets of vertices of  such that whenever  then  is a -regular pair with density at least .

Proof
We will provide proof of the counting lemma in the case when  is a triangle (triangle counting lemma). The proof of the general case, as well as the proof of the blow-up lemma, are very similar and do not require different techniques.

Take . Repeating this argument for  shows that we must have . By definition  and  so by regularity of  we obtain existence of at least

triangles containing . Since  was chosen arbitrarily from the set  of size at least , we obtain a total of at least

Proof

Proof of the triangle removal lemma

This exists by the Szemerédi regularity lemma. The idea is to remove all edges between irregular pairs, low-density pairs, and small parts, and prove that if at least one triangle still remains, then many triangles remain. Specifically, remove all edges between parts  and  if 

This procedure removes at most  edges. If there exists a triangle with vertices in  after these edges are removed, then the triangle counting lemma tells us there are at least

Thus, we may take

Proof of the graph removal lemma
The proof of the case of general  is analogous to the triangle case, and uses graph counting lemma instead of triangle counting lemma.

Induced Graph Removal Lemma

A natural generalization of the Graph Removal Lemma is to consider induced subgraphs. In property testing it is often useful to consider how far a graph is from being induced H-free. Notice that non-edges are considered as well.  is induced -free if there is no induced subgraph . We define  as -far from being induced -free if we cannot add or delete  edges to make  induced -free.

Formulation

A version of the Graph Removal for induced subgraphs was proved by Alon, Fischer, Krivelevich, and Szegedy in 2000.

Notice that our previous "cleaning" process, where we remove all edges between irregular pairs, low-density pairs, and small parts, only involves removing edges. Removing edges only corresponds to changing edge colors from red to blue. However, there are situations in the induced case where the optimal edit distance involves changing edge colors from blue to red as well. Thus, the Regularity Lemma is insufficient to prove Induced Graph Removal Lemma. The proof of the Induced Graph Removal Lemma must take advantage of the strong regularity lemma.

Proof

Strong Regularity Lemma
The strong regularity lemma is a strengthened version of Szemerédi's Regularity Lemma. For any infinite sequence of constants , there exists an integer  such that for any graph , we can obtain two (equitable) partitions  and  such that the following properties are satisfied:

 
 

The function  is defined to be the energy function defined in Szemerédi regularity lemma. (This property is captured in the third condition)

Corollary of the Strong Regularity Lemma

The following corollary of the strong regularity lemma is used in the proof of the Induced Graph Removal Lemma. For any infinite sequence of constants , there exists  such that there exists a partition  and subsets  for each  where the following properties are satisfied:

 
  is -regular for each pair 
  for all but  pairs 

The main idea of the proof of this corollary is to start with two partitions  and  that satisfy the Strong Regularity Lemma where . The expected number of irregular pairs  is less than 1. Thus, there exists some collection of  such that every pair is -regular!

This allows us to consider edges and non-edges when we perform our cleaning argument.

Proof of Sketch of the Induced Graph Removal Lemma

With these results, we are able to prove the Induced Graph Removal Lemma. The idea is to start with a collection of vertex sets  which satisfy the conditions of the Corollary of the Strong Regularity Lemma. We then can perform a "cleaning" process where we remove all edges between pairs of parts  with low density, and we can add all edges between pairs of parts  with high density. We choose the density requirements such that we added/deleted at most  edges.

Generalizations
The graph removal lemma was later extended to directed graphs and to hypergraphs.

Quantitative bounds
Tower function of height  is necessary in all regularity proofs as is implied by results of Gowers on lower bounds in regularity lemma. His proof, however, uses regularity-related ideas such as energy increment, but with different notion of energy, related to entropy. This proof can be also rephrased using Frieze-Kannan weak regularity lemma as noted by Conlon and Fox. In the special case of bipartite  it was shown that  is sufficient.

Construction for nonbipartite case is a consequence of Behrend construction of large Salem-Spencer set. This method can be leveraged for arbitrary nonbipartite  to give aforementioned bound.

Applications

Additive combinatorics

Graph theory

Property testing

See also
 Counting lemma
 Tuza's conjecture

References

Graph theory